Les Anses-d'Arlet is a town and commune in the French overseas department and region of Martinique.

Population

See also
Communes of the Martinique department

References

External links
 Official Website 

Communes of Martinique
Populated places in Martinique